Mount Spokane State Park is a public recreation area in the northwest United States,located in the Selkirk Mountains,  northeast of the city of Spokane, Washington. The state park surrounds  Mount Spokane and other peaks including Mount Kit Carson, Beauty Mountain, and Quartz Mountain.

The park receives  of snow annually and is home to Mount Spokane Ski and Snowboard Park as well as an extensive system of trails for hiking, biking, and horseback riding.

History
The park was dedicated with 1500 acres in 1927. During the 1930s, workers with the Civilian Conservation Corps (CCC) planted grass, constructed picnicking and parking areas, constructed trails and shelters, and improved roads.

Vista House 
Vista House was designed by architect, H. C. Bertelsen, as was the caretaker's cabin, although an earlier design for Vista House had been prepared by state park architect Charles Saunders. The caretaker's cabin was built by Elmer Highberg. Some sources state that Vista House was built by the CCC. However, according to the State of Washington's Cultural Resources Management Plan (2009), a local contractor, E.O. Fieldstad, won the contract with a "low bid of $4,693," and built Vista House. The publication states: "Its existence near the site of the Mount Spokane CCC camp may have contributed to the present impression held by many that the Vista House was constructed by the CCC."

Timeline

Activities and amenities
The park has  of trails for hiking, biking, and horseback riding. Trails range from easy (the  Burping Brook Loop) to difficult (the  ‘Round the Mountain Trail). Winter activities include downhill and cross-country skiing, snowmobiling and snowshoeing. Camping and picnicking are also available. Bald Knob campground is generally open from May to September. There are 7 primary trail-heads to park at from Bear Creek Lodge right before the entrance of the park to the summit parking and vista house. During the winter a Sno-park permit is required at both the Lower Selkirk Sno-Park Parking Lot and the Upper Selkirk Lodge Sno-Park Parking Lot.

Rules of the Park
For vehicles to enter the park a Discover Pass is required. The exceptions to this regulation include the following: when camping or renting accommodations, being registered as a disabled veteran or state park pass holder, and having a disabled parking permit registered by the state. The park is a participant of the pack-it-in/pack-it-out program, therefore all visitors are required to pack out whatever was brought in with them. Horses are only allowed in designated areas and all other pets are required to be on a leash. The feeding and/or harm of any wildlife is prohibited.

References

External links

Mount Spokane State Park Washington State Parks and Recreation Commission 
Mount Spokane State Park Map Washington State Parks and Recreation Commission 
Friends of Mt. Spokane State Park

State parks of Washington (state)
Parks in Spokane County, Washington
Geography of Spokane, Washington
Civilian Conservation Corps in Washington (state)